Oakwood School is a private, non-sectarian college preparatory school in the south Silicon Valley community of Morgan Hill, in Santa Clara County, California.

History 
Oakwood was founded in 1998 as the Morgan Hill Country School. Michelle Riches Helvey and her husband Ted Helvey purchased the school and reestablished the school as Oakwood School. In 2005, the high school grades began and in 2009, Oakwood graduated its first senior class.

Oakwood is the sister school of Pinewood School, Los Altos, which was founded by Gwen Riches (mother of Michelle Riches Helvey), in 1959.

Academics
Oakwood's high school is one of the best ranked college-prep schools in the San Francisco Bay Area (ranked 5th in 2016 in Silicon Valley by Niche).

Oakwood School is accredited by the Western Association of Schools and Colleges and is a member of the National Association of Independent Schools.

International studies
Oakwood is a member of the Cambridge Network, an international academic organization, which allows Oakwood to utilize the Cambridge Network's international studies program, allowing Oakwood students to travel to other network schools around the world and similarly allowing Oakwood to host international exchange students from within the network.

Athletics 
Oakwood offers Varsity and JV sports including Basketball, Volleyball, Soccer, Cross Country, Track and Field, Tennis, Golf, and Swimming, and participates in the Mission Trail Athletic League (MTAL). More than 70% of students are members of at least one sports team beginning in their freshman year. Oakwood plays competitively in several sports, and advances to the Central Coast Section (CCS) playoffs.

Advanced Placement 
Oakwood offers a large number of AP classes. The overwhelming majority of students take one or more AP classes a year (with the exception of freshmen). Such classes include AP Art (2D and 3D), AP Spanish, AP French, AP Environmental Science, AP Physics, AP Chemistry, AP Government, AP European History, and AP US History. These classes often qualify students for college credits at the college level.

College Admissions 
Oakwood is a college preparatory school, and as such, all graduates  go on to college.  Graduates attend colleges all over the nation, with a few choosing international universities. Stanford University, University of Pennsylvania, Santa Clara University, UCLA, University of California, Berkeley, University of Southern California, Pitzer, Harvey Mudd, Brigham Young University, Boston University, Colby College, Baylor University, Chapman University, McGill University and many others are among the many colleges where Oakwood students are enrolled or have attended.

Notable alumni
Romina Gupta, Team USA gold medal gymnastics champion

References

External links
 Oakwood School official website

Preparatory schools in California
High schools in Santa Clara County, California
Educational institutions established in 1998
Private high schools in California
Private middle schools in California
Private elementary schools in California
1998 establishments in California